Nords Wharf is a rural locality south of Swansea on the shore of Lake Macquarie in New South Wales, Australia. It is part of the City of Lake Macquarie local government area. 

The Aboriginal people, in this area, the Awabakal, were the first people of this land.

The first school opened in 1901.

References

External links
 History of Nords Wharf (Lake Macquarie City Library)

Suburbs of Lake Macquarie